American Dance Therapy Association was founded in 1966 to establish and maintain standards of professional education in the field of dance/movement therapy.

History
Dance/movement therapy has been a distinct profession since the 1940s. The pioneers of the movement saw the relationship of how the body and mind interact in health and in illness. Whether it be an illness of the mind which affects the body, or an illness of the body that impacts the mind and spirit, these early therapists saw the need to treat these issues.

Today
 ADTA maintains a registry of dance/movement therapists
 Sets and monitors standards for the master's level programs
 Publishes the American Journal of Dance Therapy
 Publishes timely monographs for its members and for allied professionals
 Holds a professional conference every year
 Supports formation of regional groups, conferences, seminars, workshops and meetings

ADTA is the only organization solely dedicated to the growth and enhancement of the profession of dance/movement therapy.

External links
 Official site

Dance and health